Boston is a settlement in Kampong Baroe in the Saramacca District of Suriname, near the resort capital of Kampong Baroe. Boston was founded as a wood plantation in 1819, and abandoned in 1828. In 1840, it was listed as inhabited, and used for crop cultivation.

References

Populated places in Saramacca District